Beadon may refer to:

 Sir Cecil Beadon (1816–1880), administrator in British India, Lieutenant-Governor of Bengal
 Frederick Beadon (1777–1879), English clergyman, canon of Wells Cathedral
 Dr Richard Beadon (1737–1824), Master of Jesus College, Cambridge; Bishop of Gloucester and of Bath & Wells

English-language surnames